In marketing and financial services, mass affluent and emerging affluent are the high end of the mass market, or individuals with US$100,000 to US$1,000,000 of liquid financial assets plus an annual household income over US$75,000.

Mass affluent consumers are an important target market for sellers of luxury goods.

Difference from upper middle income
There may be a high correlation between the households in the upper-middle reaches of the income strata and the mass affluent, but there are differences. Social class is the result of a person's function within society rather than merely the income of the household in which he or she resides. Both terms refer to people whose wealth or income is above the average, yet below the top. As opposed to households with above average incomes the mass affluent are also defined through liquid assets such as stocks, bonds, cash, and mutual funds. Fixed assets such as real estate are not commonly counted. This is because liquid assets provide more financial flexibility, which is a desirable trait in customers.

The mass affluent have been characterized as those who save more than they spend and invest for their future. While they worry about funding their children's college education, they realize other savings and loan options exist and they are not opposed to their children paying some part of their educational costs. The mass affluent generally may worry about replacing their paycheck in retirement, and may need to be encouraged to spend more money during their retirement years. They often wish to leave an inheritance to their children. The mass affluent will have between US$500,000 and $1.5million in investable assets upon retirement with a net worth between $500,000 and $2.5million. They spend between $4,000 and $10,000 per month in retirement.

In the United States

In the United States there are roughly 33 million mass affluent households, and they own roughly 37% of America's liquid financial assets. Among family households, approximately thirty percent could be described as being mass affluent.

See also
 Affluence in the United States
 High-net-worth individual
 Income in the United States
 Income quintiles
 Luxury good
 Status brand
 The professional/managerial middle class
 Wealth in the United States

References

Further reading
 Nunes, Paul, and Brian Johnson. Mass Affluence: Seven New Rules of Marketing to Today's Consumer, Harvard Business School Press. 2004.
 Silverstein, Michael J., and Neil Fiske. Trading Up: Why Consumers Want New Luxury Goods— and How Companies Create Them, Portfolio. 2004.

External links
 Here Come the Mass Affluent, CNN/Money
 You're Not Rich, but Now You Can Fake It, Slate
 Wealth Management: The Race to Serve the Mass Affluent, FinanceTech
 MasterCard Analysis of Mass-Affluent Consumers Reveals Importance of Customization, PaymentsNews
 Attracting the mass-affluent, business.scotsman.com
 Chasing the Mass Affluent Customers
 Mass Affluence: Seven New Rules for Marketing to Today's Customer
 Luxury goes mass market, Fortune
 A $400 Coach bag? Shoppers think twice, Fortune

Market segmentation
Social classes
Social groups